Niles Township High School District 219 is a public secondary school district in the U.S. state of Illinois.

The district serves Lincolnwood and parts of Morton Grove, Niles, and Skokie in Niles Township, which is located in Northern Cook County, Illinois.

The district has had a number of successes in the arts and sciences.  In 2007, the Kennedy Center for the Performing Arts named District 219's arts program the best in the nation.  In addition to Niles West's success in Science Olympiad, it is one of the few school districts which can claim two Nobel laureates as alumni.

On November 1, 2022, the district became the first in the United States to approve Assyrian-language course offerings following their addition to the Illinois State Course Catalog. District 219 has an approximately 30% Assyrian population, as per community organization D219 Suraye.

The district is also known for a long history of labor disputes, which have disrupted classes.

Geography
The district is roughly bordered by Central Street on the north, McCormick Boulevard on the east, Devon Avenue on the south, and Harlem Avenue on the west.

Among the notable sites within the district are the Illinois Holocaust Museum & Education Center and the Leaning Tower of Niles.

Board of Education
There are seven members of the district board, each elected to a four-year term. There is no limit on the number of terms a member may hold.

The board for the 2022-2023 school year is:

Member Matthew Flink was appointed September 9, 2022 following the resignation of former member Jill Manrique.

Schools
Niles North High School
Niles West High School
Niles Central High School

Other Facilities 

 Bridges Adult Transition Center

Former schools
Niles East High School (1938–80)

Labor relations
The district and its employees have had a long history of labor problems, dating back to the 1960s.

The first strike authorization by teachers came in October 1966, when teachers represented by the American Federation of Teachers voted to authorize a strike in order to secure collective bargaining rights. Teachers again authorized a strike in May 1967 over salary demands. This time, a strike did take place. 85 teachers crossed picket lines, and over 150 parents entered the school to teach. A court ordered an end to the strike the day after it started. Despite the court order, 200 teachers refused to return to school, with 100 calling in "sick". After two days of disruption, the strike was called off by local union officials.

In May 1970, the teachers again authorized a strike over salary.  While negotiations continued throughout 1970 and into 1971, the authorization to strike was reaffirmed in March 1971. The strike threat continued into the 1971–72 school year.

Teachers again authorized a strike in September 1973 over payment for non-teaching time. Teachers did follow through with their strike threat despite an offer of 8% increase in salary. After five days, teachers accepted a contract with an 8% pay increase in the first year, and a gradually increasing pay increase throughout the life of the three-year contract.

In September 1976, the teachers union again authorized a strike, this time at the cost of seven days of school.  When the strike took place, teachers were threatened with firing, which a judge requested the school board delay. This strike ended after seven days.

1979 saw another strike, though classes were able to resume on a modified schedule with teachers who crossed the picket line and substitutes. After 15 days, the strike was ended with double-digit salary increases for teachers.

A 1985 strike lasting 11 days ended after the teachers and Board of Education submitted to an arbitrator to solve final details of the contract.

The remainder of the 1980s and early 1990s remained relatively quiet. 1996 saw the next strike action. The Board of Education tried to force teachers back to work, claiming the strike was illegal during arbitration sessions, though teachers remained on strike. As the strike wore on, some of the fall sports teams were forced to forfeit their final regular season games and their state playoff games.  The situation worsened when it was learned that the federal mediator had taken a week off to attend a conference at a resort. The Illinois Labor Relations Board publicly condemned both sides for failing to work in earnest to end the strike. By November 2, the District began announcing plans to replace striking teachers by as early as November 18. Parental involvement eventually helped end the strike on November 4 after 14 days. The final contract was ratified in January 1997, with the district stating an estimated cost of the strike at US$300,000, including a need to sweep areas for electronic eavesdropping devices.

Notable alumni

References

External links
 Niles Township High School District 219

School districts in Cook County, Illinois
Education in Skokie, Illinois